Myodopsylla insignis is a species of flea that parasitizes bats.
It is found in North America, occurring as far west as Alberta and Iowa and as far east as Pennsylvania and Quebec.
It feeds on bats in the genera Eptesicus, Perimyotis, and Myotis.
The little brown bat, Myotis lucifugus, is considered its primary host.

References

Fleas
Insects described in 1903
Parasites of bats